Labrador Inuit Pidgin French, also called Belle Isle Pidgin, was a French-lexified pidgin spoken between Breton and Basque fishermen and the Inuit of Labrador from the late 17th century until about 1760.

See also
Algonquian-Basque pidgin, used in the same area
NunatuKavut people

References

French-based pidgins and creoles
Languages of Canada
Extinct languages of North America
North America Native-based pidgins and creoles
Languages attested from the 17th century
Languages extinct in the 18th century
Inuit in Newfoundland and Labrador
European-Canadian culture in Newfoundland and Labrador
French language in the Americas